The 9th constituency of Moselle is a French legislative constituency in the Moselle département.

Description

Moselle's 9th constituency consists of the city of Thionville close to the border with Luxembourg and the surrounding more rural areas.

The seat was held by Gaullist parties from 1988 until 2017. Following the suicide of Jean-Marie Demange in 2008, Anne Grommerch acquired it.

Historic Representation

Election results

2022 

 
 
|-
| colspan="8" bgcolor="#E9E9E9"|
|-

2017

2012

 
 
 
 
 
|-
| colspan="8" bgcolor="#E9E9E9"|
|-

Sources
Official results of French elections from 2002: "Résultats électoraux officiels en France" (in French).

9